Gelo is an Indian Punjabi-language drama film based on the Punjabi novel Gelo written by doyen of Punjabi literature, Late Ram Sarup Ankhi. The film is directed by Manbhavan Singh. Produced by Celebration Studioz and Sonark Solutions, it features Jaspinder Cheema and Gurjit Singh in the lead roles. The music is composed by Umar Sheikh. The film was released worldwide on 5 August 2016.

Synopsis
Gelo is the story of a girl whose name is Gurmel Kaur. She belongs to the Malwa belt of Punjab. The movie presents the problems of the farmers living in the Malwa belt of Punjab.

Cast
Jaspinder Cheema as Gelo  
Pavan Malhotra as Balwant Singh
Gurjit Singh as Raama
Gurpreet Bhangu as Raama's mother
Dilavar Sidhu as Jagtar
Aditya Tarnach  
Raj Dhaliwal

Music

References

External links 
 Gelo on Facebook
 

Films set in Punjab, India
Films shot in Punjab, India
2016 films
Punjabi-language Indian films
2010s Punjabi-language films
Films based on Indian novels